Bassano Airport  is an airport located  north of Bassano, Alberta, Canada.

References

External links
Page about this airport on COPA's Places to Fly airport directory

Registered aerodromes in Alberta
County of Newell